Colombia women's national inline hockey team is the national inline hockey team for Colombia. The team competed in the 2013 Women's World Inline Hockey Championships.

References 

National inline hockey teams
Inline hockey in Colombia
inline hockey